The samadhi of Sri Bodhendra Saraswathi, the 59th Shankaracharya of Kanchi matha is located in the town of Govindapuram in Thanjavur district, India and is an important Hindu pilgrimage destination.

History 
Bodhendra Saraswathi, the 17th-century pontiff of the Kanchi matha reached Govindapuram during the course of his wanderings in the Cauvery delta. He was attracted by the beauty of the place and decided to attain samadhi or salvation at the spot.

One morning, in the Purattasi (September-October) month of the year 1692, Bodhendra Saraswathi attained Jeeva Samadhi sitting in an yogic state. He attained Videha Mukthi at Govindapuram on Full Moon day in the month of Proshtapada of the cyclic year Prajotpatti (1692 AD).

Sri Sri Bodhendra Saraswathi Swamigal

Sri Bhagavannama Bodhendra Saraswathi Swamigal alias Sri Bodhendral was born in Maṇḍana Miśra Agraharam at Kanchi as the son of Kesava Panduranga. Sri Bodhendral's former name was Purushothama. It was Sri Bodhendral who stressed the efficacy of devotion as a means to liberation in this Kali Yuga. Sri Bodhendral therefore undertook the Nama Siddhantha, or establishing the supreme efficacy of reciting the names of Bhagavan in many of His writings, chiefly in Namamritha Rasayana and Namamritha Rasodhaya. Sri Bodhendral's mission of Nama Siddhantha was pursued with equal vigor by Sridhara Venkatesa Ayyaval of Tiruvisainallur and by Sathguru Swamigal of Marudanallur. It was the Nama Siddhanta of Sri Bodhendral that was ultimately responsible for the evolution of Bhajana Sampradhaya as an institution in the religious life of the Hindu community in South India. Sri Bodhendral performed Tatanka Pratishtha at Jambukeswaram and while returning to Kanchi

Sanctity 
A samadhi was constructed by Bodhendra's disciples over the physical space of his internment and yearly aradhanas are conducted at his samadhi.

Notes 

Monuments and memorials in Tamil Nadu
Hindu temples in Thanjavur district
Samadhis